Jalalabad is a city and a municipal council, just outside of Fazilka city in Fazilka district in the Indian state of Punjab. It is just 11 km from International India-Pakistan Border.

History
Mamdot Nawabi was created by Qutubuddin Khan in 1800 in the Fazilka district. He conquered Mamdot from the Rai of Raikot in 1800. Jalalabad was founded by Nawab of Mamdo as its capital. It is named after Nawab Jalaluddin Khan, son of Nawab Qutubuddin Khan, a very rich city in Punjab and known for vast industrial area.

Geography

Jalalabad is a constituency in the Indian state of Punjab. The Fazilka district is one of six border districts in Punjab, out of 22 total districts. In the Fazilka district, there are three tehsils: Jalalabad West, Fazilka, and Abohar. The Pakistani border is around 15 km from Jalalabad.

Important Places in Jalalabad
 Sports Stadium
Multipurpose sports stadiums at Jalalabad constructed for the second edition of World Kabaddi Cup which was conducted in November 2011.
 Rice Mills
There are Rice Mills at the outskirt of the city which exports Rice.

Famous personalities from Jalalabad (W)
 Deputy Chief Minister of Punjab up to 16 March 2017, Sukhbir Singh Badal, is the MLA From Jalalabad West. 
Indian cricket player Shubhman Gill belongs to Jalalabad. He also played in IPL.
Businessman and Wire Tycoon Chiranjeev Singh Soni belongs to Jalalabad. He lives in Delhi now.
Famous cricketer Ramesh Kumar belongs to Jalalabad West, selected in the KKR team (IPL Franchise) and Punjab Ranji Team.
It is home to famous personality Parav kalra who has represented India at various International summits.

References

Cities and towns in Fazilka district